The 2015 Renault Sport Trophy season was the inaugural season of the Renault–supported touring car category, a one-make racing series that is part of the World Series by Renault. The season began at Circuit de Spa-Francorchamps on 30 May and finished on 18 October at Circuito de Jerez. The series formed part of the World Series by Renault meetings at six triple header rounds.

Andrea Pizzitola won the Elite Class, Dario Capitanio gained both the Prestige Class and the Endurance Trophy, sharing the car with David Fumanelli. Oregon Team won the teams' championship.

Teams and drivers

Race calendar and results

Championship standings

For Elite and Prestige Class only eight results out of nine counted for the championship.

Elite class

Prestige class

Endurance Trophy

Teams' Championship

References

External links
 Renault-Sport official website
 Renault Sport Trophy official website

Renault Sport Trophy
Renault Sport Trophy
Renault Sport Trophy